The Gunaikurnai or Gunai/Kurnai language, also spelt Gunnai, Kurnai, Ganai, Gaanay, or Kurnay  ) is an Australian Aboriginal dialect cluster of the Gunaikurnai people in Gippsland in south-east Victoria.  Bidawal was either a divergent dialect or a closely related language.

Varieties
 means 'man'. The language had no traditional name, but each of its dialects was referred to separately.

In a 1996 report to the Victorian Aboriginal Corporation for Languages, Clark refers to five Gunaikurnai dialects: Brabralung, Braiakalung, Brataualung, Krauatungalung and Tatungalung.

  ( = man,  = belonging to) located in central Gippsland.
  ( = Man,  = west,  = belonging to) located around Sale through to the mountains.
  (men belonging to this place which have fire;  = men,  or  = fire,  = belonging to)  located in South Gippsland.
  ( = east,  = belonging to) located eastwards to the Snowy River.
  ( = sea,  = belonging to) located in the coast area between Lake King and Lake Wellington.

Gunaikurnai dialects have been confused with Muk-thang/Bidawal; there appear to be two distinct languages here, but it's not clear which variety belongs to which.

Phonology
Like other Victorian languages, Gunaikurnai allowed initial  in its words. This is quite unusual for an Australian language, and the same pattern was found in the Tasmanian languages across Bass Strait.

Consonants

Vowels

Revival
Since the early 1990s, the Victorian Aboriginal Corporation for Languages (VACL) organisation, established the Yirruk-Tinnor Gunnai/Kŭrnai language program which focused on reviving and reclaiming the Gunnai language of Gippsland. Doris Paton, Coordinator of the Program and Lynnette Solomon-Dent, Language worker and consultant are involved in the program. They have been responsible for developing a number of resource materials to support and educate further knowledge of the Gunnai language and Culture. Lynnette Solomon-Dent co-wrote with Christina Eira the VACL Linguist, the Victorian Curriculum and Assessment Authority (VCAA) Aboriginal Languages, cultures and reclamation in Victorian schools: standards P-10 and protocols and were involved in the VCE Revival and Reclamation Study. These teaching documents and resources are collectively used to educate school aged children P-10, VCE, higher learning institutions and the Aboriginal community members, to further their knowledge and allow community members to continue to educate future generations.

Placenames possibly derived from the Gunaikurnai language
A number of placenames in Gunaikurnai country feature the ending , meaning "place".

References

Notes

Gippsland languages
Extinct languages of Victoria (Australia)
Gunaikurnai